Sainte-Anne-des-Plaines is a city in southwestern Quebec, Canada, 40 km northwest of the city of Montreal in the Thérèse-De Blainville Regional County Municipality, in the region of Laurentides. Its population was 14,990 during the census of 2014.

The city has the Sainte-Anne-des-Plaines Complex of the Correctional Service of Canada, which includes the Regional Reception Centre (multi-level security), housing Special Handling Unit (SHU), Canada's highest-security unit; Sainte-Anne-des-Plaines Institution (maximum security), and the Regional Mental Health Centre (multi). It also has the Archambault Institution.

Demographics 

Education
The Commission scolaire de la Seigneurie-des-Mille-Îles (CSSMI) operates French-language schools.
 École primaire de l'Harmonie-Jeunesse
 École primaire des Moissons
 École primaire Du Bois-Joli
 École secondaire du Harfang

Sir Wilfrid Laurier School Board operates the English-language public schools.
 Pierre Elliot Trudeau Elementary School in Blainville
 Rosemere High School in Rosemere

Communities
Domaine des Cyprès - located along Montee Morel with residents north of rue Robert located within Camping Sainte-Anne. Golf Le Champetre located along east side of Morel.
Domaine Normandie - located along Boulevard Normandie south of Rang LePage the small community is centred around Lac de Normandie
Lac des Plaines - located northwest of La Plaine and centred around Lac des Plaines. Homes along the lake are mostly trailers with fixed homes to the north. Large forest area found just north of the community.
Lepage - centred at Rang Lepage and Highway 335 and located just south of Sainte-Anne-des-Plaines.
Sainte-Anne-des-Plaines - largest of the communities along Highway 335. Commercial and other critical services provided here.

References

External links

See also
Saint Pierre River (Mascouche), a river
Rivière des Mille Îles, a river

Cities and towns in Quebec
Incorporated places in Laurentides
Greater Montreal
Canada geography articles needing translation from French Wikipedia